State Route 507 (SR 507) is a short east–west state route in western Ohio, located entirely in the northern portion of Champaign County.

Route description
Heading east from there, this state route jogs northeasterly briefly before continuing easterly through farm country. Passing its intersection with McClain Road, SR 507 turns to the southeast. At Champaign County Road 223, SR 507 bends to the northeast, and continues in that direction through its junction with SR 245 near the Ohio Caverns, where the highway comes to an end. The roadway continuing beyond SR 245 after SR 507 terminates is Mount Tabor Road.

History
SR 507 was first designated in 1937 along the routing that it currently occupies.  Little has changed along SR 507 over the years, other than that route that it meets at its eastern terminus was designated as SR 275 when SR 507 first came into being. Later on, SR 275 would be re-designated as SR 245.

Major intersections

References

External links

507
Transportation in Champaign County, Ohio